Reddellomyces is a genus of truffle-like fungi in the Tuberaceae family. The genus, circumscribed in 1992, contains four species found in Australasia and the Mediterranean.

References

External links
 

Pezizales
Truffles (fungi)
Pezizales genera